The Puerto Rico men's national volleyball team represents Puerto Rico in international volleyball competitions and friendly matches. In 2007 the squad won the silver medal at the NORCECA Volleyball Championship after defeating Cuba in the semi-finals. With that performance Puerto Rico for the first time qualified for the Volleyball World Cup, later that year in Japan.

Results

World Championship
1974 – 23rd place
2006 – 12th place
2010 – 13th place
2014 – 21st place
2018 – 21st place
2022 – 22nd place

World Cup
2007 – 6th place

World League
2011 – 16th place
2014 – 27th place
2015 – 28th place
2016 – 36th place

NORCECA Championship
1969 – 6th place
1971 – 4th place
1973 – 4th place
1975 – Did not participate
1977 – 4th place
1979 – Did not participate
1981 – 5th place
1983 – 5th place
1985 – 6th place
1987 – 6th place
1989 – 4th place
1991 – 5th place
1993 – 4th place
1995 – 4th place
1997 – 5th place
1999 – 5th place
2001 – 5th place
2003 – 5th place
2005 – 5th place
2007 –  Runners-up
2009 –  3rd place
2011 – 4th place
2013 – 4th place
2015 –  3rd place
2017 – Did not participate
2019 – 5th place
2021 –  Winners

Pan American Games
1955 – Did not participate
1959 – 8th place
1963 – Did not participate
1967 – 8th place
1971 – 11th place
1975 – Did not participate
1979 – 6th place
1983 – 7th place
1987 – Did not participate
1991 – 5th place
1995 – 6th place
1999 – Did not participate
2003 – 7th place
2007 – 5th place
2011 – 7th place
2015 – 4th place

Pan-American Cup
2006 – Did not participate
2007 –  Silver medal
2008 – 7th place
2009 – 4th place
2010 –  Bronze medal
2011 – 4th place
2012 – Did not participate
2013 – 4th place
2014 – 4th place
2015 – 7th place
2016 – Did not participate
2017 –  Silver medal
2018 – 4th place
2019 – 6th place
2021 – 5th place
2022 – 5th place

Current squad
The following is the Puerto Rican roster for the 2022 FIVB Volleyball Men's World Championship.

 Head coach:  Ossie Antonetti

<noinclude>

References

External links
Official website
FIVB profile

Volleyball
National men's volleyball teams
Men's sports in Puerto Rico
Volleyball in Puerto Rico